Sarsfield Street is a street in Limerick, Ireland. The street commences at Sarsfield Bridge (which crosses the River Shannon) and continues in a south east direction forming a crossroads junction with Liddy Street (to the north) and Henry Street (to the south). The street continues towards its junction with O'Connell Street where it ends. Sarsfield Street along with William Street forms an overall thoroughfare that bisects Limerick City Centre from west to east. O'Connell Street in turn bisects the city centre from north to south. The street prior to the construction of the Limerick Southern Ring Road and the Shannon Bridge was the start of the main N18 road between Limerick (and the south & south east) and Galway.

The street was originally known as Brunswick Street until the early 20th century. It was renamed after Patrick Sarsfield the first Earl of Lucan and who was the Irish Jacobite leader in the Siege of Limerick (1690). Sarsfield arranged the subsequent Treaty of Limerick.

In the early 21st century, Sarsfield Street has seen a number of shop closures. Dunnes Stores, which had a large shopping complex on the street, closed it in 2008 and moved to nearby Henry Street.

References

Shopping districts and streets in Ireland
Streets in Limerick (city)